Jaroslav Levinský and Filip Polášek were the defending champions, but lost in the final to Marco Chiudinelli and Michael Lammer, 7–5, 6–3.

Seeds

Draw

Draw

External links
Draw

Doubles